In Ayurvedic medicine, the compilation of traditional ancient Indian medicine practice is called rasashastra, which details processes by which various metals, minerals and other substances, including mercury, are purified and combined with herbs in an attempt to treat illnesses. Rasashastra is a pharmaceutical branch of Indian system of medicine which mainly deals with the metals, minerals, animal origin product, toxic herbs and their use in therapeutics.

History of development 

The credit of developing rasashastra as a stream of classical Ayurveda, especially in fulfilling its healthcare-related goals, goes to Nāgārjuna (5th century CE).

Classical textbooks

Rasendra Mangala 
It was composed by Nāgārjuna Siddha in the Sanskrit language. P. C. Rây considered this work (which he erroneously called Rasaratnākara) to be amongst the earliest surviving alchemical works, perhaps from as early as the 7th or 8th century. The text actually dates to the 12th century. Rasendramangala originally comprised eight chapters, only four of which are found in the manuscripts available today.   Manuscripts of the work are found at Gujarat Ayurveda University, Jamnagar, at Rajasthan Prachya Vidya Pratishthan, Govt. office Bikaner and elsewhere. An edition and translation was published in 2003.

Rasa Hridaya Tantra 
It was created by Shrimad Govind Bhagvatapad, guru of Shankaracharya, around in the 10th century. It contains elaborate description of dhatuvada ( metallurgical processes to transform mercury into higher metals as gold or silver).  A Sanskrit commentary on this text was contributed by Shri Chaturbhuj Mishra under the name of  Mugdhavabodhini.

Rasarnava 
Edited and published in 1908–1910.
Written by Bhairava.

Rasa Prakasha Sudhakara 

It is a 13th-century text by Acharya Yashodhar Bhatt. It was first published by Acharya Yadavji Trikam in 1910. Its second edition was published in 1912 under guidance of Shri Jivaram Kalidas Vyas. It contains 13 chapters describing both Lauhavad (use of metallurgical processes to convert lower metals to higher metals), and Chikitsavad ( use of metals and minerals for therapeutic use). It also describes the origin of mercury, its properties, 18 samskaras (processing techniques) of mercury as well as the tools and techniques involved in them.

Rasendra Chudamani 
It was created by Aacharya Somadeva approximately in 12th–13th century. It contains 13 chapters which give elaborate description of mercury and its processing for medicinal use; definition and description of equipments and Puta (temperature requirements and regulation during processing). It can be inferred that at the time of its creation the Gurukula system of education was prevalent as it contains description about Shishyopnayana samskara ( ritual performed at the time of admission ). Specific contribution of this text include high degree of organization followed during compilation and description of 64 divya-aushadis (drugs with miraculous effect) for the very first time.

Rasa Ratna Samuccaya 
It was created by Vāgbhaṭa, son of Vaidyapati Siṃhagupta, around the end of the 13th century or beginning of the 14th century. It contains around 30 chapters. It is considered one of the best treatises written in the field of rasashastra. It contains vivid description of Yantras (tools, equipments), Puta (temperature related processing details), classification of metals and minerals into Rasa, Uprasa, Lauha, Dhatu, Updhatu etc. as well as their processing details. It also describes clinical aspects of Rasa aushadhis. However, it is not considered as an original text. Rather it is considered as a compilation of works of other Acharyas. Though it may contain some original work of Vagbhatta, but it is difficult to differentiate. It derives much of its contributions from Rasendrachudamani of Somadeva. Rasaprabha and Vijnanbodhini are two of the Hindi commentaries available. Saralarthprakashini is one of the Sanskrit commentary available by Sriyut Shastri Khare.

Methods
The methods of rasashastra are contained in a number of Ayurvedic texts, including the Charaka Samhita and Susruta Samhita. An important feature is the use of metals, including several that are considered to be toxic in evidence-based medicine.  In addition to mercury, gold, silver, iron, copper, tin, lead, zinc and bell metal are used. In addition to these metals, salts and other substances such as coral, seashells, and feathers are also used.

The usual means used to administer these substances is by preparations called bhasma, Sanskrit for "ash". Calcination, which is described in the literature of the art as shodhana, "purification", is the process used to prepare these bhasma for administration.  Sublimation and the preparation of a mercury sulfide are also in use in the preparation of its materia medica. A variety of methods are used to achieve this.  One involves the heating of thin sheets of metal and then immersing them in oil (taila), extract (takra), cow urine (gomutra) and other substances. Others are calcined in crucibles heated with fires of cow dung (puttam). Ayurvedic practitioners believe that this process of purification removes undesirable qualities and enhances their therapeutic power.

Toxicity
Modern medicine finds that mercury is inherently toxic, and that its toxicity is not due to the presence of impurities. While mercury does have anti-microbial properties, and used to be widely used in Western medicine, its toxicity does not warrant the risk of using it as a health product in most circumstances. The Centers for Disease Control and Prevention have also reported a number of cases of lead poisoning associated with Ayurvedic medicine. Other incidents of heavy metal poisoning have been attributed to the use of rasashastra compounds in the United States, and arsenic has also been found in some of the preparations, which have been marketed in the United States under trade names such as "AyurRelief", "GlucoRite", "Acnenil", "Energize", "Cold Aid", and "Lean Plus".

Ayurvedic practitioners claim that these reports of toxicity are due to failure to follow traditional practices in the mass production of these preparations for sale, but modern science finds that not only mercury, but also lead is inherently toxic. The government of India has ordered that Ayurvedic products must specify their metallic content directly on the labels of the product; however, M. S. Valiathan noted that "the absence of post-market surveillance and the paucity of test laboratory facilities [in India] make the quality control of Ayurvedic medicines exceedingly difficult at this time.

References

Ayurveda
Alchemical traditions
Alternative medicine